Dharam Dass Shastri (born 10 March 1937 in Hyderabad, Sindh, (now in Pakistan)) is politician from Delhi, India. He belongs to Indian National Congress Party.He served as opposition leader in Delhi Metropolitan Council from 1977 to 1980.

He was member of 7th Lok Sabh during 1980–84. He was elected from Karol Bagh (Lok Sabha constituency) of Delhi.

He was accused of having led the mobs in anti sikh riots of 1984.

References

1937 births
India MPs 1980–1984
Lok Sabha members from Delhi
Indian National Congress politicians
People from Hyderabad District, Pakistan
Living people
People from Central Delhi district